The MF Vis is a passenger and vehicle ferry built in 1965 by the shipyards Flensburger Schiffbaugesellschaft of Flensburg. It was launched on 12 April 1965 and placed in service on August 31, 1965 as Sydfyn by Færgefart Nordic.

Histoire 
The Sydfyn is a ferry built in 1965 by the shipyards Flensburger Schiffbaugesellschaft of Flensburg. It was launched on 12 April 1965 and placed in service on 31 August 1965 as Sydfyn by Færgefart Nordic between Gelting and Faaborg. It leave this itinerary only between 1 February and 10 March 1967, when it was operated by OP-Linien and used between Kastrup and Malmö.

On 11 April 1965, it was sold to Jadrolinija who renamed it Vis. During its career for the Jadrolinija, it ran on three itineraries, while starting between Split, Hvar and Vis. In 1991, it was transferred under Croatian but stayed on the same road. In 2000, Vis is replaced by Vela Luka on its way. Between 2004 and 2011, it made a link between Dubrovnik and Sobra.

In March 2011, it was sold to Tuninha Transporte Maritimo and became Vicente. Its career ended on 8 January 2015 around 8 pm, when it sank near São Filipe in unknown circumstances resulting in the deaths of 22 people.

Notes

External links

  The story of the Vis on faktaomfartyg.se

Ships built in Flensburg
1965 ships